Comoro may refer to:

Comoro (East Timor), a village in Dom Aleixo Administrative Post, Dili District, East Timor
Comoro Islands, an archipelago lying between Madagascar and the African continent
Comoro River, on the island of Timor
Comoro International Airport, the former name of Presidente Nicolau Lobato International Airport, the main airport of East Timor
Comoros, an island country in the Indian Ocean
Grande Comore, the principal island of this country

See also
 Komoro (disambiguation)